The 1985 Benson & Hedges Cup was the fourteenth edition of cricket's Benson & Hedges Cup.

The competition was won by Leicestershire County Cricket Club.

Fixtures and results

Group stage

Group A

Group B

Group C

Group D

Quarter-finals

Semi-finals

Final

References
CricketArchive - 1985 Benson & Hedges Cup

See also
Benson & Hedges Cup

Benson & Hedges Cup seasons
1985 in English cricket